Mawlānā Hafiz Hamdullah Saboor (Urdu: مولانا حافظ حمد اللہ صبور)  is a Pakistani politician who previously served as the member of Senate of Pakistan.

Political career
He was elected MPA of Balochistan Assembly in 2002 General Elections on Muttahida Majlis-e-Amal ticket, and served as Provisional Health Minister from 2002 till 2005. 

In March 2012 he was elected to the Senate of Pakistan on general seat as Jamiat Ulema-e-Islam (F) candidate. 

He is the chairperson of senate committee on Religious Affairs and Interfaith Harmony, and member of functional committee on Government Assurances, Information Technology and Telecommunication and committee on Ports and Shipping.

See also 
 Ayatullah Durrani
 Abdul Rahim Khan Mandokhel

References

External links
Senate Profile 
Instagram

Telegram

Living people
1968 births
Jamiat Ulema-e-Islam (F) politicians
Pakistani senators (14th Parliament)
Pakistani people of Afghan descent
Stateless people
Balochistan MPAs 2002–2007
Provincial ministers of Balochistan
Muttahida Majlis-e-Amal MPAs (Balochistan)